Lake Chippewa, also known as Chippewa Flowage, is an artificial lake in northwestern Wisconsin. It is fed by the East Fork Chippewa River and the West Fork Chippewa River. Winter Dam at the southern end is where the Chippewa River flows out of the lake.

References

External links
 Map of Chippewa Flowage area

Reservoirs in Wisconsin
Lakes of Sawyer County, Wisconsin